Lytoceras batesi is an ammonite species belonging to the family Lytoceratidae. These cephalopods were fast-moving nektonic carnivores. They lived in the Cretaceous period.

References
Discover Yale Digital Content
YPM Invertebrate Paleontology - Online Catalog
Timothy William Stanton Contributions to the Cretaceous Paleontology of the Pacific Coast, pg. 75

Cretaceous ammonites
Lytoceratidae